Korshamn Chapel is a parish church of the Church of Norway in Lyngdal Municipality in Agder county, Norway. It is located in the village of Korshamn. It is one of the churches for the Lyngdal parish which is part of the Lister og Mandal prosti (deanery) in the Diocese of Agder og Telemark. The white, wooden church was built in a long church design in 1906 using plans drawn up by the architect Arne Abrahamsen. The church seats about 100 people.

See also
List of churches in Agder og Telemark

References

Lyngdal
Churches in Agder
Wooden churches in Norway
20th-century Church of Norway church buildings
Churches completed in 1906
1906 establishments in Norway